Jacobaea aquatica or Senecio aquaticus, the water ragwort or marsh ragwort, is a plant of the family Asteraceae.  It is a perennial or biennial plant: young plants form a rosette near the ground, eventually producing a taller flowering shoot with many bright yellow flower heads, each with prominent ray florets.  It grows in damp, grazed grassland, especially where there has been some disturbance.

Biogeography
Jacobaea aquatica is endemic to Europe. It may be found throughout the continent, except Finland and Eastern Europe. There are small populations in the European part of Turkey and on Svalbard.

References

The Global Compositae Checklist
The Plant List

aquatica
Flora of Europe
Plants described in 1761